François Zocchetto (born 14 December 1958) is French lawyer and politician who served as a member of the Senate of France from 2001 until 2017, representing the Mayenne department. He is a member of the Centrist Alliance and caucuses with the Centrist Union. In 2019, he joined independent law firm De Gaulle Fleurance & Associés in Paris as a partner.

Career in the private sector
A chartered accountant, Zocchetto began his private career with an audit/accounting and statutory auditor firm, and then founded in 1987 a law firm in business law for small and medium-sized enterprises (SMEs) located in Paris and Western France.

Political career
In the 2012 French presidential election, Zocchetto supported François Bayrou before endorsing Nicolas Sarkozy in the election's second round.

In 2013, Jean-Louis Borloo of the Union of Democrats and Independents (UDI) included Zocchetto in his shadow cabinet; in this capacity, he served as opposition counterpart to Minister of Justice Christiane Taubira.

References

on the Senate website

1958 births
Living people
Union for French Democracy politicians
Democratic Movement (France) politicians
Centrist Alliance politicians
French Senators of the Fifth Republic
ESCP Europe alumni
Sciences Po alumni
French people of Italian descent
Mayors of places in Pays de la Loire
People from Laval, Mayenne
Union of Democrats and Independents politicians
Senators of Mayenne